Richard Petty is an American racing driver who competed in the NASCAR Cup Series championship from 1958 to 1992. Over the course of his racing career, Petty amassed 200 victories in the top series of NASCAR, becoming the most prolific winner in series history.

NASCAR

Grand National/Winston Cup Series
Petty won 200 races from 1960 to 1984. Of those, 196 wins came with Petty Enterprises, mainly in the No. 43 but also in Nos. 41 and 42 from 1962 to 1966. Petty ran two dirt races for owner Don Robertson in 1970 at Columbia Speedway and North Carolina State Fairgrounds as part of a deal with Petty Enterprises, winning both starts. He moved to newly-formed Curb Racing for 1984 and 1985, winning his last two career races during the 1984 season.

Convertible Division
Petty ran fifteen races in the NASCAR Convertible Division in 1958 and 1959, winning one race at Columbia Speedway.

Winston West Series
Petty competed in eight Winston West Series races from 1964 to 1984, winning three times at Phoenix International Raceway.

Exhibition Races

See also
 List of all-time NASCAR Cup Series winners

References

NASCAR race wins
Career achievements of racing drivers
NASCAR-related lists